Clothes moth or clothing moth is the common name for several species of moth considered to be pests, whose larvae eat animal fibres (hairs), including clothing and other fabrics.

These include:
 Tineola bisselliella, the common clothes moth or webbing clothes moth
 Tinea pellionella, the case-bearing clothes moth. Obsolete names are: Phalaena (Tinea) pellionella, Phalaena zoolegella, Tinea demiurga, Tinea gerasimovi, and Tinea pelliomella
 Trichophaga tapetzella, the carpet moth or tapestry moth
 Monopis crocicapitella, pale-backed clothes moth. Particularly destructive of textiles, and found to have increased dramatically in south-west England in 2018.
 Niditinea fuscella, the brown-dotted clothes moth

Diet
The larvae of clothes moths eat animal fibres, which are not removed by other scavengers. In human societies, garments and textiles are made of animal fibres; several moth species eat them, creating holes and damage, and are consequently considered a pest, deriving their generic common name from their diet.

Treatment and control

Various means are used to repel or kill moths. Pheromone traps are also used both to count and to destroy clothes moths, although these only attract certain species of clothes moth so it is possible to have an active clothes moth infestation without any moths being found on the pheromone traps.

Among other methods, recommendations to protect heritage collections of textiles include checking the undersides of chairs, moving and vacuum-cleaning all furniture once a month and sealing the discarded vacuum cleaner bag, checking and shaking textiles every month, and regularly checking attics and chimneys. If textiles do become infested, adults, eggs and larvae can be killed by freezing garments in sealed bags for a fortnight (14 days).

References

Insects in culture
Insect common names